The 1980 French motorcycle Grand Prix was the third round of the 1980 Grand Prix motorcycle racing season. It took place on the weekend of 23–25 May 1980 at the Paul Ricard Circuit.

Classification

500 cc

References

French motorcycle Grand Prix
French
Motorcycle Grand Prix
May 1980 sports events in Europe